Toda people are a Dravidian ethnic group who live in the Indian state of Tamil Nadu. Before the 18th century and British colonisation, the Toda coexisted locally with other ethnic communities, including the Kota, Badaga and Kurumba, in a loose caste-like society, in which the Toda were the top ranking. During the 20th century, the Toda population has hovered in the range 700 to 900. Although an insignificant fraction of the large population of India, since the early 19th century the Toda have attracted "a most disproportionate amount of attention from anthropologists and other scholars because of their ethnological aberrancy" and "their unlikeness to their neighbours in appearance, manners, and customs". The study of their culture by anthropologists and linguists proved significant in developing the fields of social anthropology and ethnomusicology.

The Toda traditionally live in settlements called , consisting of three to seven small thatched houses, constructed in the shape of half-barrels and located across the slopes of the pasture, on which they keep domestic buffalo. Their economy was pastoral, based on the buffalo, whose dairy products they traded with neighbouring peoples of the Nilgiri Hills. Toda religion features the sacred buffalo; consequently, rituals are performed for all dairy activities as well as for the ordination of dairymen-priests. The religious and funerary rites provide the social context in which complex poetic songs about the cult of the buffalo are composed and chanted.

Fraternal polyandry in traditional Toda society was fairly common; however, this practice has now been totally abandoned, as has female infanticide. During the last quarter of the 20th century, some Toda pasture land was lost due to outsiders using it for agriculture or afforestation by the State Government of Tamil Nadu. This has threatened to undermine Toda culture by greatly diminishing the buffalo herds. Since the early 21st century, Toda society and culture have been the focus of an international effort at culturally sensitive environmental restoration. The Toda lands are now a part of The Nilgiri Biosphere Reserve, a UNESCO-designated International Biosphere Reserve; their territory is declared UNESCO World Heritage Site.

Population

According to M. B. Emeneau in 1984, the successive decennial Census of India figures for the Toda are: 1871 (693), 1881 (675), 1891 (739), 1901 (807), 1911 (676) (corrected from 748), 1951 (879), 1961 (759), 1971 (812). In his judgment, these records 
"justif[y] [sic] concluding that a figure between 700 and 800 is likely to be near the norm, and that variation in either direction is due on the one hand to epidemic disaster and slow recovery thereafter (1921 (640), 1931 (597), 1941 (630)) or on the other hand to an excess of double enumeration (suggested already by census officers for 1901 and 1911, and possibly for 1951). Another factor in the uncertainty in the figures is the declared or undeclared inclusion or exclusion of Christian Todas by the various enumerators ... Giving a figure between 700 and 800 is highly impressionistic, and may for the immediate present and future be pessimistic, since public health efforts applied to the community seem to be resulting in an increased birth rate and consequently, one would expect, in an increased population figure. However, earlier predictions that the community was declining were overly pessimistic and probably never well-founded."

Physical anthropology
Physical anthropologist Egon Freiherr von Eickstedt, in 1934, described the Todas as being of the North Indid division of the Indid type, therefore connecting them to ancient Proto Dravidian population. DNA studies in the early 21st century showed that the Toda and Kota share genes which distinguish them from the other Nilgiri Hill Tribes.

Culture and society

The Toda are most closely related to the Kota both ethnically and linguistically.

Clothing
The Toda dress consists of a single piece of cloth, which is worn wrap over a dhoti for men and as a skirt for women along with shawlwrap.

Economy
Their sole occupation is cattle-herding and dairy-work. Holy dairies are built to store the buffalo milk.

Marriage

They once practiced fraternal polyandry, a practice in which a woman marries all the brothers of a family, but no longer do so. All the children of such marriages were deemed to descend from the eldest brother. The ratio of females to males is about three to five. The culture historically practiced female infanticide. In the Toda tribe, families arrange contracted child marriage for couples.

Houses

The Todas live in small hamlets called s. The Toda huts, called s, are of an oval, pent-shaped construction with sliding door. They are built of bamboo fastened with rattan and are thatched. Thicker bamboo canes are arched to give the hut its basic bent shape. Thinner bamboo canes (rattan) are tied close and parallel to each other over this frame. Dried grass is stacked over this as thatch. Each hut is enclosed within a wall of loose stones.

The front and back of the hut are usually made of dressed stones (mostly granite). This unusually small entrance is a means of protection from wild animals. The front portion of the hut is decorated with the Toda art forms, a kind of rock mural painting.

Food
The Todas are vegetarians and do not eat meat, eggs that can hatch, or fish (although some villagers do eat fish). The buffalo were milked in a holy dairy, where the priest/milkman also processed their gifts. Buffalo milk is used in a variety of forms: butter, butter milk, yogurt, cheese and drunk plain. Rice is a staple, eaten with dairy products and curries.

Religion

According to the Toda Religion, the goddess Teikirshy and her brother first created the sacred buffalo and then the first Toda man and woman. Many rites feature the buffalo, its milk and other products form the basis of their diet.

The Toda religion exalted high-class men as holy milkmen, giving them sacred status as priests of the holy dairy. According to Sir James Frazer in 1922 (see quote below from Golden Bough), the holy milkman was prohibited from walking across bridges while in office. He had to ford rivers by foot, or by swimming. The people are prohibited from wearing shoes or any type of foot covering.

Toda temples are distinct from Hindu temples and are constructed in a circular pit lined with stones. They are similar in appearance and construction to Toda huts. Women are not allowed to enter or go close to these huts that are designated as temples.

From Frazer's Golden Bough, 1922:

Total Toda Population: (100%) 2200
Hinduism Toda Religion: 87.83% (1932)
Christianity: 11.14% (245)
Islam: 0.94% (20)
Buddhism: 0.04% (1)
Unknown: 0.04% (1)

Language
The Toda language is a member of the Dravidian family. The language is typologically aberrant and phonologically difficult. Linguists have classified Toda (along with its neighbour Kota) as a member of the southern subgroup of the historical family proto-South-Dravidian. It split off from South Dravidian, after Kannada, but before Malayalam. In modern linguistic terms, the aberration of Toda results from a disproportionately high number of syntactic and morphological rules, of both early and recent derivation, which are not found in the other South Dravidian languages (save Kota, to a small extent.)

Culture

The forced interaction with other peoples with technology has caused a lot of changes in the lifestyle of the Todas. They used to be primarily a pastoral people but now, they are increasingly venturing into agriculture and other occupations. They used to be strict vegetarians but now, some people eat meat.

Although many Toda abandoned their traditional distinctive huts for houses made of concrete, in the early 21st century, a movement developed to build the traditional barrel-vaulted huts. From 1995 to 2005, forty new huts were built in this style, and many Toda sacred dairies were renovated. Each has a narrow stone pit around it and the tiny door is held shut with a heavy stone. Only the priest may enter it. It is used for storage of sacred buffalo milk.

Embroidery

Registrar of Geographical Indication gave GI status for this unique embroidery, a practice which has been passed on to generations. The status ensures uniform pricing for Toda embroidery products and provides protection against low-quality duplication of the art.

Notes

References
Classic Ethnographies
.
.
 
 

Toda Music, Linguistics, Ethnomusicology

.
.
.
Nara, Tsuyoshi and Bhaskararao, Peri. 2003. Songs of the Toda. Osaka : ELPR Series A3-011.91pp [+3CDs with sound files of the songs].
.
Shalev, M. Ladefoged, P. and Bhaskararao, P. 1994. "Phonetics of Toda."  PILC Journal of Dravidic Studies, 4:1. 19-56pp. (Earlier version in: University of California Working Papers in Phonetics. 84. 89-126 pp.). 1993.
Spajic', S. Ladefoged, P. and Bhaskararao, P. 1996. "The Trills of Toda." Journal of International Phonetic Association, 26:1. 1-22pp.

Modern Anthropology, Sociology, History

.
.
.
.
.

Toda Traditional Knowledge, Environment, and Modern Science

From: Chhabra, Tarun. 15 August 2002. "Toda's Traditions In Peril", Down to Earth. Quote: 
. 
.(Pictures of a new house being built on pages 57–60, and new house, with decorative art, being blessed on page 70) 
. 
India Environmental Trust. 2005. Supported Projects: Edhkwehlynawd Botanical Refuge (EBR) - Reforestation in a Tribal Area
National Committee for the Netherlands for the International Union for the Conservation of Nature (IUCN-NL). 2006. Funded Projects:, India: Nilgiri Hills, NGO (EBR), 8 Hectares.
.

External links

The Society for Ecological Restoration and Indigenous Peoples' Restoration Network. EIT PROJECT SHOWCASE: The Edhkwehlynawd Botanical Refuge (EBR)
India Environmental Trust. 2005. Supported Projects: Edhkwehlynawd Botanical Refuge (EBR) - Reforestation in a Tribal Area
National Committee for the Netherlands for the International Union for the Conservation of Nature (IUCN-NL). 2006. Funded Projects:, India: Nilgiri Hills, NGO (EBR), 8 Hectares.
 Toasting the Todas2008. Travelogue with pictures of ceremonies.
 Ethnologue: Toda, A language of India

Nilgiris district
Scheduled Tribes of India
Dravidian peoples
Social groups of Tamil Nadu
Indigenous peoples of South Asia